Bertrand Lemercier (born 1 March 1968) is a retired French tennis player.

Lemercier has a career high ATP singles ranking of 486 achieved on 2 May 1994. He also has a career high doubles ranking of 180 achieved on 26 July 1993.

Lemercier has won 1 ATP Challenger doubles title at the 1992 Istanbul Challenger.

Tour titles

Doubles

References

External links
 
 

1968 births
Living people
French male tennis players
Tennis players from Paris